Lawrence Station can refer to:

In places:
Lawrence Station, New Brunswick, Canada
Lawrence Station, New Jersey, USA

In transportation:
Lawrence station (CTA), a Chicago "L" station
Lawrence station (Kansas), an Amtrak station in Lawrence, Kansas, USA
Lawrence station (Caltrain), a Caltrain station in Sunnyvale, California, USA
Lawrence (LIRR station), a Long Island Rail Road station in Lawrence, New York, USA
Lawrence station (Toronto), a subway station in Toronto, Ontario, Canada
Lawrence East station, a subway station in Toronto, Ontario, Canada
Lawrence West station, a subway station in Toronto, Ontario, Canada
McGovern Transportation Center, formerly Lawrence station, a commuter rail station in Lawrence, Massachusetts

Other uses:
Lawrence Experiment Station, an experimental sewage treatment facility in Lawrence, Massachusetts

See also
St Lawrence railway station (disambiguation)
Lawrence (disambiguation)
Lawrence Hill railway station